Michael Hanscom Smith is a career member of the US Senior Foreign Service who had served as Consul General in Hong Kong and Macau from July 2019 to July 2022.  Smith has also served as Consul General in Shanghai (2014–2017), Director/Acting Deputy Assistant Secretary of the Office of Chinese and Mongolian Affairs at the Department of State. He also served as Economic Section Chief at the Taipei Main Office of the American Institute in Taiwan (AIT), and team leader at the United States Provincial Reconstruction Team in the Iraqi Province of Muthanna.

Education
Smith earned a bachelor’s degree from Georgetown University, master’s degrees from the London School of Economics and Princeton University, a certificate in political studies from Sciences Po in Paris and was a Council on Foreign Relations International Affairs Fellow in Japan.

Jackson School of Global Affairs 
Smith is a senior fellow at the Jackson School of Global Affairs at Yale. When speaking about the Global Financial Leaders' Investment Summit, Smith warned companies that "It's not business as usual in Hong Kong, and those companies who do business are going to have to grapple with that uncertainty for the foreseeable future."

Personal life
While Consul in Shanghai, he and his same-sex partner Lu Ying-tsung also known as Eric Lu, who is from Taiwan, married in San Francisco. As gay marriage is illegal in China, his marriage, as well as the marriage of British Consul General Brian Davidson to his husband, has caused a “stir.” On 5 January 2022 he announced on social media the birth of their son Julian Lu Smith. In addition to English, Smith speaks Mandarin Chinese, French, Danish, and Khmer.

References

LGBT ambassadors of the United States
Gay diplomats
21st-century American diplomats
Consuls general of the United States in Hong Kong and Macau
Consuls general of the United States in Shanghai
People of the American Institute in Taiwan
Georgetown University alumni
Alumni of the London School of Economics
Princeton University alumni
United States Foreign Service personnel